This is a season-by-season list of records compiled by the University of Massachusetts Amherst men's ice hockey team.

UMass has reached the Frozen Four twice in school history, both times advancing to the NCAA Championship game. In 2019 they were the runners up to the Minnesota–Duluth Bulldogs and then won the championship over the St. Cloud State Huskies in 2021.

Season-by-season results

Note: GP = Games played, W = Wins, L = Losses, T = Ties

* Winning percentage is used when conference schedules are unbalanced.

Footnotes

References

 
Lists of college men's ice hockey seasons in the United States
UMass Minutemen ice hockey seasons